Dakeil Jonathan Thorpe (born 12 September 1989) is a Barbadian badminton player. Thorpe competed at the 2010, 2014, and 2018 Commonwealth Games. He also represented his country at the 2015 Pan American Games. He was the men's doubles champion at the 2018 Carebaco International with Shae Michael Martin and at the 2016 Suriname International tournament partnered with Cory Fanus. Thorpe also won the mixed doubles event at the 2016 Carebaco International with Tamisha Williams.

Achievements

BWF International Challenge/Series 
Men's doubles

Mixed doubles

  BWF International Challenge tournament
  BWF International Series tournament
  BWF Future Series tournament

References

External links 
 
 Dakeil Thorpe at g2014results.thecgf.com
 

Living people
1989 births
Sportspeople from Bridgetown
Barbadian male badminton players
Badminton players at the 2018 Commonwealth Games
Badminton players at the 2014 Commonwealth Games
Badminton players at the 2010 Commonwealth Games
Commonwealth Games competitors for Barbados
Badminton players at the 2015 Pan American Games
Badminton players at the 2019 Pan American Games
Pan American Games competitors for Barbados
Competitors at the 2010 Central American and Caribbean Games
Competitors at the 2014 Central American and Caribbean Games